The 2013 Women's Six Nations Championship, also known as the 2013 RBS Women's Six Nations, due to the tournament been sponsored by the Royal Bank of Scotland, was the 12th  series of the annual women's rugby union competition. Matches were held in February and March 2013, on the same weekends as the men's tournament.

 won their first championship, winning both a Triple Crown and a Grand Slam at the same time. In their opening match of the campaign, Ireland beat  12–10. Then on 9 February 2013 they defeated  for the first time. Alison Miller scored a hat-trick of tries as Ireland won 25–0.  On 23 February 2013 they clinched their first Triple Crown with a 30–3 win against Scotland.
On 8 March 2013 Ireland effectively won the championship after they defeated France 15–10. It was confirmed the following day after  failed to defeat England. Ireland eventually finished four points clear of runners-up France. Ireland secured the Grand Slam with a 6–3 away win against Italy on Saint Patrick's Day. Two penalties from Niamh Briggs gave Ireland  their fifth win in a row.

Italy's defence was one of the revelations of the tournament - aside from the first half against England. This was by far and away their best ever Six Nations. Injuries to key players at the start of the tournament hampered France's challenge, but they were in magnificent form at home, won for the first time at Twickenham, and lost only narrowly in Italy and Ireland. Wales would also have been broadly content with their performance, with narrow defeats to Ireland and England - but wins over Italy and Scotland ensured World Cup qualification, which was their main aim. Scotland, on the other hand, suffered some horrendous defeats in a very disappointing campaign where they scored no tries and only three points. As for England, like 2009, the vast majority of their leading players were left out of the Six Nations squad to prepare for the forthcoming Sevens World Cup taking place in June in Russia, so they used the Sevens World Series as a warm-up for that event. Consequently, they had a largely inexperienced squad with only 3 players remaining from the successful series win over New Zealand in the Autumn of 2012.

Table

Fixtures and results

Week 1

Assistant referees:
Barbara Guastini (Italy)
Monia Salvini (Italy)
Assessor:
Valeria Ballardini (Italy)

Assistant referees:
Sarah Cox (England)
Simon Bourne (England)
Assessor:
David Warren (England)

Assistant referees:
Kelvin Shorte (Wales)
Peter Evans (Wales)
Assessor:
Vernon Brown (Wales)

Week 2

Assistant referees:
n/a
n/a
Assessor:
n/a

Assistant referees:
Helen O'Reilly (Ireland)
Edward Kenny (Ireland)
Assessor:
Michael Carroll (Ireland)

Assistant referees:
n/a
n/a
Assessor:
n/a

Week 3

Assistant referees:
Alex Pratt (Scotland)
Brian Darling (Scotland)
Assessor:
n/a

Assistant referees:
Clare Daniels (England)
Michael Patz (England)
Assessor:
Keith Page (England)

Assistant referees:
Federica Guerzoni (Italy)
Beatrice Benvenuti (Italy)
Assessor:
n/a

Week 4

Assistant referees:
Ken Henley-Willis (Ireland)
Gary Glennon (Ireland)
Assessor:
Tim Aplin (Ireland)

Assistant referees:
Michael Cooper (England)
Nikki O'Donnell (England)
Assessor:
Steve Riley (England)

Assistant referees:
Mhairi Hay (Scotland)
Alex Pratt (Scotland)
Assessor:
Andy Clift (Scotland)

Week 5

Assistant referees:
n/a
n/a
Assessor:
n/a

Assistant referees:
Barbara Guastini (Italy)
Doranna De Carlini (Italy)
Assessor:
Valeria Ballardini (Italy)

Assistant referees:
Simon Rees (Wales)
Alan Jenkins (Wales)
Assessor:
n/a

Leading Scorers

Individual Ranking:
Tries:
5 : Miller (Ireland).
4 : Trémoulière (France), Tuson (England) And Hunter (England).
3: Briggs (Ireland) Guiglion (France) And Billes (France).
2 : Crowley (England), Large (England) Chamberlain (England) Wilson (England), Murray (Wales) Ladagnous (France), Mignot (France), Agricole ( France), N'diaye (France) And Chobet (France).
1: Mcgilchrist (England) Gallagher (England), Reed (England) Scott (England) Gallagher (England), Clark (England), Thompson ( England), Le Pesq (France), Salles (France), Godiveau (France), Edwards (Wales), S. Harries (Wales), L. Harries (Wales), Fletcher (Wales), York (Wales), Spence (Ireland), Bourke (Ireland), Egan (Ireland) Fleming (Ireland), Severin (Italy), Barattin (Italy).

Penalties & Conversions:
1. Reed (England) 35 Pts
2. Schiavon (Italy) 29 Pts
3. Briggs (Ireland) 28 Pts
4. Bailon (France), 16 Pts
5. Trémoulière (France) 14 Pts
6. Prosser (Wales) 12 Pts
7. Agricole (France) 10 Pts
8. Snowsilll (Wales) 8 Pts
9. Ritchie (Scotland) 3 Pts

Overall Individual Points
1. Briggs (Ireland), 43 Pts
2. Reed (England) 40 Pts
3. Schiavon (Italy) 29 Pts
4. Miller (Ireland) 25 Pts
5. Trémoulière (France) 34 Pts
6. Hunter (England), Tuson (England), Agricole (France), 20 Pts
9. Bailon (France), 16 Pts
10. Guiglion (France), Billes (France), 15 Pts

References

External links
The official RBS Six Nations Site

2013
2013 rugby union tournaments for national teams
2012–13 in English rugby union
2012–13 in French rugby union
2012–13 in Irish rugby union
2012–13 in Italian rugby union
2012–13 in Scottish rugby union
2012–13 in Welsh rugby union
2012–13 in European women's rugby union
rugby union
rugby union
rugby union
rugby union
Women
rugby union
rugby union
Women's Six Nations
Women's Six Nations